Jia Jia, born in 1951, Tianjin, a former General Secretary of the Shanxi Provincial Association of Scientists and Technology Experts before he left China in 2006 and was granted political refugee status by UN refugee commission, and accepted by New Zealand as a permanent resident.

Arrested by Chinese government

On 22 October 2009, Jia Jia returned to China arriving at Beijing Capital International Airport from New Zealand, on a mission to bring democracy to the Chinese people. He was arrested at the airport.

Sentenced to jail for 8 years

On 13 May 2011, Jia Jia has been sentenced to jail for 8 years and deprived of political rights for 2 years  under the name of ‘subversion of state power’.

References

External links
Letter written by Jia Jia's son

Living people
Chinese prisoners and detainees
Chinese dissidents
Chinese emigrants to New Zealand
Refugees in New Zealand
Year of birth missing (living people)